Prakriti is "the original or natural form or condition of anything, original or primary substance". It is a key concept in Hinduism, formulated by its Sāṅkhya school, where it does not refer to matter or nature, but "includes all the cognitive, moral, psychological, emotional, sensorial and physical aspects of reality," stressing "prakṛti's cognitive, mental, psychological and sensorial activities." Prakriti has three different innate qualities (guṇas), whose equilibrium is the basis of all observed empirical reality. Prakriti, in this school, contrasts with Puruṣa, which is pure awareness and metaphysical consciousness. The term is also found in the texts of other Indian religions such as Veda & Jainism and Buddhism.

Etymology and meaning
Prakriti (Sanskrit: प्रकृति) is an early Indic concept, which means "making or placing before or at first, the original or natural form or condition of anything, original or primary substance." The term is discussed by Yāska (~600 BCE) in Nirukta, and found in numerous Hindu texts. It connotes "nature, body, matter, phenomenal universe" in Hindu texts.

According to Dan Lusthaus,

Pancha Prakriti 
In Indian languages derived from Sanskrit roots, Prakriti refers to the feminine aspect of all life forms, and more specifically a woman is seen as a symbol of Prakriti.

In Hinduism,  the concept of Prakriti is thoroughly mentioned. According to Sanskrit scriptures, Brahma Vaivarta Purana, Devi Mahatmya and Devi Bhagavata Purana, five Hindu goddesses are considered as the complete feminine personification of Prakriti - Saraswati, Lakshmi, Parvati, Gayatri and Radha. Together these five goddesses are worshiped as Pancha Prakriti.

Application in Indian philosophy

In the Sāṅkhya and Yoga philosophical literatures, it is contrasted with Purusha (spirit, consciousness), and Prakriti refers to "the material world, nature, matter, physical and psychological character, constitution, temper, disposition". According to Knut Jacobsen, in the dualistic system of the Samkhya school, "Purusha is the principle of pure consciousness, while Prakriti is the principle of matter", where Purusha is the conscious witness in every living being, while Prakriti is the manifest world.

In Hindu cosmology, Prakṛti is the feminine aspect of existence, the personified will and energy of the Supreme (Brahman); while in Shaktism, the Goddess is presented as both the Brahman and the Prakṛti. In Samkhya-Yoga texts, Prakriti is the potency that brings about evolution and change in the empirical universe. It is described in Bhagavad Gita as the "primal motive force". It is the essential constituent of the universe and is at the basis of all the activity of the creation.

In Vishishtadvaita Vedanta, Prakṛti is one of the six substances (Dravya). The Guṇas (qualities) are the attributes of primordial Nature (Prakṛti), and not its constituents, unlike Sāṅkhya. These qualities are inseparable from Prakṛti, but not identical with it and inextricably related to Ishvara. Prakṛti in Vishishtadvaita Vedanta is limited above by the eternal manifestation (nityavibhuti) whereas it's infinite in Sāṅkhya.

According to Dvaita Vedanta, Prakṛti is the material cause (Satkaryavada) of the world.

Prakriti is closely associated with the concept of Maya within Hindu texts.

In Jainism the term Prakriti is used in its theory of Karma, and is considered "that form of matter which covers the perfections of the soul (jiva) and prevents its liberation".

According to Samkhya and the Bhagavad Gita Prakrti or Nature is composed of the three gunas which are tendencies or modes of operation, known as Rajas (creation), Sattva (preservation), and tamas (destruction). Sattva encompasses qualities of goodness, light, and harmony. Rajas is associated with concepts of energy, activity, and passion; so that, depending on how it is used, it can either have a supportive or hindering effect on the evolution of the soul. Tamas is commonly associated with inertia, darkness, insensitivity. Souls who are more tamasic are considered imbued in darkness and take the longest to reach liberation.

See also
 Akasha
 Dvaita Vedanta
 Shakti
 Ammavaru

References

External links

 Bhagavad Gita 13.1-2 (bhagavadgitaasitis.com)
 Prakrti and Ayurveda 

Hindu philosophical concepts